Pandavgad Fort)  (also called Pandugad) (Wai T; 17° 55' N, 73° 50' E; RS. Wathar, 20 m. SE;), 4177 feet above sea level, lies four miles north-west of Wai. The fort is conspicuous over a low spur branching east from its southern angle. From a distance it appears a square fortification with natural escarpment of cut black stone.
The fort can be reached by a footpath diverting to the north from Bhoganv, a village 3 miles west of Wai on Wai -Velang State Transport route. In Bhoganv village, there is a small memorial of Vaman Pandit, the celebrated Sanskrit poet of the 15th century. The approach to the fort is very difficult and at places the path is barely a foot in width with the hill slopes on one side and deep valleys on the other. Hill though not covered with thick forest has a considerable foliage of bushy shrubs. A path from Bhogaon leads to small break in the above-mentioned spur and from this break it continues by a shoulder of the hill, on which are few huts belonging to Kolis formerly connected with the fort and charged with attendance on the temple.
The ascend from the Koli hills is steepish and for the last two hundred yards had steps cut in stone. At the northern end the path reaches the entrance gate which now consists of two broken pillars of enormous size. It had a single archway with apparently no door.
The fort is about six acres in extent and nearly a square. Its defences consist of a scarp generally from forty to sixty feet high, more than usually precipitous and in many places actually overhanging and surmounted by a wall with masonry ramparts. The original materials of enormous blocks of dry stone have nearly all disappeared and except the northern end where the gateway and wall are of the huge masonry of the old forts what remains is very light work.
Of the 18 ponds which supplied the garrison with water, only three possess water. On the top a large pond on the eastern part is silted up. To the north of the main gate, some 150 feet down the shoulder of the hill is a group of small ill maintained rock cut water cisterns.
All the buildings on the fort excepting that of the temple of Pandjaidevi are in a state of complete ruin. The temple is built in local stone masonry and is not in any way imposing. A hall in front of the shrine of devi measures about 30'X20' and has a flat roof supported on four pillars. Number of ancient buildings on the fort have been reduced to a mere heap of bricks. In the centre, remains of the main building are hidden by a thick growth of bushy shrubs.
The fort commands an excellent view of the surrounding area. To the east one gets a bird's eye view of Wai, and Mandhardev stands conspicuously about 4 miles to the north-west. To the west Kenjalgad marks a prominent object at a distance of about 5 miles.

History

The fort is said to have been built by the Kolhapur Silahara chief Bhoja II. (1178-1193) of Panhala. About 1648 it is mentioned as being in the charge of a Bijapurmokasadar stationed at Wai. [Grant Duffs Marathas, Vol. I, 109.] In 1673 it was taken by Chhatrapati Shivaji [Grant Duffs Marathas, Vol. I, 202.]. In 1701 Pandavgad surrendered with Chandan Vandan to Aurangzeb's officers. [Grant Duffs Marathas, Vol. I, 303.]. In 1713 during his flight from Chandrasen Jadhav the Maratha captain or Senapati, Balaji Vishvanath afterwards the first Peshva, being refused shelter by the Sachiv's agent at Sasvad attempted to cross to Pandavgad in the opposite valley. Closely pursued, he contrived to conceal himself until two Marathas, Pilaji Jadhav and Dhumal, then common cavaliers in his service, gathered a small troop of horse and carried him with great difficulty to Pandavgad where he was protected by Shahu's orders. Chandrasen demanded that Balaji should be given up and in case of refusal threatened to renounce his allegiance. Shahu refused to give up Balaji and sent orders to Haibatrav NimbalkarSarlashkar then at Ahmadnagar to march on at once to Satara. Meanwhile, Balaji was in Pandavgad surrounded by Chandrasen's troops. But hearing of Haibatrav's arrival at Phaltan about forty miles east, Chandrasen quitted Pandavgad and marched to Deur about fifteen miles to the south-east [Grant Duffs Marathas, Vol. I, 323.]. During Trimbakji Dengle's insurrection in 1817 Pandavgad was taken by the insurgents. It surrendered in April 1818 to a detachment of the 9th Native Infantry Regiment under Major Thatcher [Bombay Courier, 18 April 1818.].

Pandavgad Caves

The Pandavgad caves are situated on a small south-east projection of Pandavgad fort within the limits of Dhavdi village. On taking the path to Pandavgad and reaching the opening in the hills instead of turning up the shoulder of the hill to ascend the fort, the way to the caves goes straight on towards Dhavdi by a well defined footpath which skirts the face of the hill. The small spur with the caves is found at about a distance of 300 yards. The angle it makes with the main spur should be made for and about 200 feet up are the caves. The first is a flat roofed chapel or chaitya about twenty-one feet by seven and about twelve to fourteen feet high. An arched entrance blocked up with mud and stones leads to a relic shrine or daghoba four and a half feet in diameter and six feet high. Its capital (head portion) is lost. Close by is another cave seven feet square, also flat-roofed with an arched entrance and containing a mutilated stone instead of the daghoba and locally said to be a ling. It looks more like a daghoba, being fully three feet in diameter at the base and scarcely a foot at the top. East of Cave II is an eight-celled dwelling cave or vihar about thirty-five feet square and five feet high. The floor has been much silted up with earth brought in by rain water. The original height, as seen from the outside, was probably eight feet. The roof is flat and the rock overhangs four feet making a verandah with an entrance in its back wall about eight feet wide. The cells are two each on the east and west and four on the north, and there is a bed shelf all round. Five yards to the west is a rock-cut cistern six feet deep and nine feet wide holding no water. The Pandavgad caves are in good condition to this date and are visited by a number of people.

References

Forts in Satara district